Annerie Dercksen (born 26 April 2001) is a South African cricketer. In January 2023, she was named in the South Africa Women's squad for the  South Africa Tri-Nation Series. She made her Twenty20 International debut against West Indies at Buffalo Park, East London in South Africa.

In January 2023, she was named in South Africa's squad for the 2023 ICC Women's T20 World Cup in South Africa.

References

External links

2001 births
Living people
Cricketers from the Western Cape
South African women cricketers
South Africa women Twenty20 International cricketers
South Western Districts women cricketers
Free State women cricketers